The CARS Solid Rock Carriers Tour (formerly known as the USARacing Pro Cup Series, USAR Hooters Pro Cup Series, CARS Pro Cup Series, Rev-Oil Pro Cup Series, CARS X1-R Pro Cup Series) is a stock car auto racing series in the United States.  It is sanctioned by the Championship Auto Racing Series and sponsored by Solid Rock Carriers. The series races throughout the United States on paved short tracks in North Carolina, Virginia, and South Carolina.

History

The sanctioning body was formed by Hooters owner Robert Brooks. Brooks created the organization to honor the memories of four people who died in an April 1, 1993 airplane crash: Brooks' son Mark Brooks, reigning NASCAR champion Alan Kulwicki, Dan Duncan, and pilot Charlie Campbell. The sanctioning body started as the Hooters Cup late model series in 1995. Brooks decided to stop sanctioning the late model series in favor of the Pro Cup series while at the September 1997 race at the Milwaukee Mile. Brooks wanted to move to steel-bodied racecars much like those raced in the NASCAR Busch Series (now NASCAR Xfinity Series) and ARCA Racing Series at the time. There were eleven races in 1997. The series was expanded to twenty races in 1998.

In 2001, the series devised a "northern division" and a "southern division" that race separately. After the regular season, the top drivers from each division participate in a five-race playoff series called the Four Champions Challenge. Winners of the respective division are awarded a 25-point bonus for the playoff and a cash bonus as regular season champions. The driver who gets the most points in the Four Champions races, and the seeding points, (four races in 2001, five races from 2002 until 2005, six in 2006, 5 races in 2007) is declared the USAR champion.

At the end of the season, each of the top 30 teams that competes in at least half of the series' regular season races in their division is given entry points based on the number of points one competitor can earn for finishing in that respective position in a race. Beginning in 2006, the top 15 in each division automatically qualified. Each driver collects points for each race they participate in during the Championship Series, adding to their entry points collected from their regular season finish. A ten-point bonus is awarded for every driver who attempts to qualify at every race, although driver must race three of the six races to qualify for postseason bonus prizes. Cash bonuses are available for winning four, five, or all six postseason races. In 2003, Shane Huffman won a bonus for winning three of the five races. The success of this series led to NASCAR devising its own playoff system in 2004. The sanctioning body's owner, Robert Brooks, who also owned the Hooters restaurant chain, died in July 2006, leading to the eventual sale of the series and the restaurant chain's disassociation. USAR officials combined the Northern and Southern divisions in 2009. Hooters dropped its sponsorship of the series the same season, and the series later re-branded itself as the USARacing Pro Cup Series.

On August 25, 2011, Series Director and Owner Jack McNelly announced that the series would be operating under the name "Championship Auto Racing Series" (CARS Pro Cup). The series picked up title sponsorship from Revolution Oil, renaming the series the Rev-Oil Pro Cup Series through the 2013 season.

After entries began dropping through the final years of the season, during the 2014 playoff (only ten cars were entered at some races during the season with a low of four cars at Coastal Plains Raceway in Jacksonville, NC), CARS began to transition the series into a Late Model Stock Car series.  Late Model Stocks (which use perimeter chassis, not to be confused with offset chassis Super Late Models) were permitted in selected races.  By the end of the 2014 season, with the demise of the UARA-STARS Tour after a year's suspension, CARS effectively transitioned the Pro Cup into the CARS Tour which effectively absorbed the former UARA tour by adding a division for Late Model Stocks (the perimeter style cars run at places like Martinsville and most tracks in the southeast) and Super Late Models (the types of cars run in the Snowball Derby, Winchester 400, Oxford 250, among other races nationally).  The new two-division format started in the 2015 season, with car counts averaging 55 cars per stop in the ten-race tour combined.

The sanctioning body once again broke the mold in 2015 by becoming the first asphalt tour to carry its own streaming and broadcast service, CARS Tour TV, a division of Pit Row Media and their Pit Row TV brand. For the first time in asphalt late model history, an entire tour's schedule was broadcast online and has been since the tour's re-inception in 2015. Pit Row Media has a long-term agreement with the tour to produce and carry event broadcasts, including syndication agreements to REV TV in Canada, SPEED SPORT on MAVTV in the USA, and other networks and distribution partners.

The new format consisted of a 100-150 lap race in each division.  The Super Late Model Tour has a working relationship with the United Super Late Model Rules Alliance, which consists of the ARCA/CRA Super Series, ARCA Midwest Tour, SRL Southwest Tour and the Southern Super Series for a common Super Late Model rules package to establish teams in any of the major tours can run all series with few changes.

After three seasons with the format, CARS split the two divisions on selected weekends beginning in 2018, in order to prevent conflicts with major Super Late Model and Late Model Stock races from a regional and national basis.

In 2021, the Late Model Stock Tour had plans to once again visit Rockingham Speedway, formerly known as "The Rock" during its NASCAR days, reviving the dormant track for a second time under new ownership and management.

Starting in 2022, the CARS Tour will discontinue the Super Late Model Division and replace it with a Pro Late Model Division in an attempt to draw more competitors.

On January 9, 2023, the CARS Tour was acquired by a consortium of four companies: DEJ Management, Jeff Burton Autosports, Inc., Kevin Harvick Incorporated, and Trackhouse Racing Team. All four are NASCAR-related, with two current national series team owners, a Cup Series champion, and a Cup Series majors winner.

2023 CARS TOUR Schedule

CARS Tour Champions (1997–present)

Late Model and Pro Late Model format (2022–present)

Late Model and Super Late Model format (2015–2021)

Four Champions Playoff ProCup Champions (2001–2014)
The following drivers won the Four Champions playoff series after the series was split into two divisions:
 2014 Caleb Holman
 2013 Clay Rogers
 2012 J.P. Morgan
 2011 Jeff Agnew
 2010 Clay Rogers
 2009 Clay Rogers
 2008 Benny Gordon
 2007 Bobby Gill
 2006 Clay Rogers
 2005 Benny Gordon
 2004 Clay Rogers
 2003 Shane Huffman
 2002 Jason Sarvis
 2001 Bobby Gill

ProCup Series Champions (1997–2000)
 2000 Bobby Gill
 1999 Bobby Gill
 1998 Jeff Agnew
 1997 Mario Gosselin

CARS Tour Rookies of the Year (1996-present)

CARS Tour Rookies of the Year

ProCup Rookies of the Year
 2014 Codie Rohrbaugh
 2013 Brady Boswell
 2012 Dalton Hopkins
 2011 Blake Jones
 2010 Logan Ruffin
 2009 Lucas Ransone
 2008 Drew Herring
 2007 Brandon Ward
 2006 Derek Kale
 2005 Woody Howard
 2004 Matt Carter
 2003 Benny Gordon
 2002 Brian Ross
 2001 Toby Robertson
 2000 Brian Vickers
 1999 Steven Christian
 1998 Jeff Agnew
 1997 Brad May
 1996 E. Shane Rice

Notable alumni, competitors and graduates (1995–present)

Anthony Alfredo
Benny Gordon
Brian Scott
Brian Vickers
"Bubba" (Andrew) Pollard
Buckshot Jones
Cale Gale
Caleb Holman
Carson Hocevar
Carson Kvapil
Chad Chaffin
Chase Elliott
Chase Purdy
Christian Eckes
Christopher Bell
Colby Howard
Cole Rouse
Corey Heim
Corey LaJoie
Dakoda Armstrong
Dalton Sargeant
Danny O'Quinn
Darrell "Bubba" Wallace
Drew Dollar
Gus Dean
Gracie Trotter
Hailie Deegan
Hannah Newhouse
Harrison Burton
Jake Crum
James Buescher
Jeb Burton
Joe Graf, Jr.
Joey Coulter
Joey Logano
John Hunter Nemechek
John Wes Townley
Jon Wood
Josh Berry
Justin Haley
Justin Labonte
Kaz Grala
Kertus Davis
Landon Cassill
Landon Huffman
Lee Pulliam
Matt Craig
Matt Kenseth
Mason Diaz
Myatt Snider
Nicole Behar
Noah Gragson
Peyton Sellers
Philip Morris
Quin Houff
Raphael Lessard
Regan Smith
Riley Herbst
Rodney Childers
Ross Kenseth
Ryan Repko
Sam Mayer
Sammy Smith
Scott Riggs
Scott Wimmer
Spencer Davis
Stacy Puryear
Stefan Parsons
Stephen Leicht
Stephen Nasse
Steve Wallace
Tanner Gray
Tate Fogleman
Taylor Gray
Timothy Peters
Todd Gilliland
Todd Peck 
Trevor Bayne 
Ty Gibbs
Tyler Ankrum
Tyler Matthews
Vinnie Miller
William Byron
Zane Smith

Notes

References

External links
Official CARS Racing Tours Website
Official CARS Tour TV website
CARS Tour Digest Website
CARS Pro Cup Series stats from 1997 to present
USAR history, written in 1999 and 2002, accessed June 2006
Insight to new Pro Cup owners
https://web.archive.org/web/20120426085404/http://www.procuponline.com/trackback.php?id=20110825102747910

Hooters
Stock car racing series in the United States
Auto racing organizations in the United States
1997 establishments in the United States
Dale Earnhardt Jr.
Kevin Harvick